Nicholas Archdale may refer to:

Sir (Nicholas) Edward Archdale, 2nd Baronet (1881–1955) of the Archdale Baronets
Sir Nicholas Edward Archdale, 4th Baronet (born 1965) of the Archdale Baronets